Bessarion (stylized as BEssARION) born Besarion Razmadze is a  Georgian fashion designer based in Russia.

Bessarion was born on August 31, 1978 in Tbilisi. He was named after the Georgian poet Besarion Gabashvili known as Besiki.

Bessarion-designed shirts with Georgian inscriptions made in Georgian alphabet like სიყვარული (Love) and იესო, which is only Georgian word that can be written in the shape of cross (Jesus) became popular in Russia and was worn by the Russian celebrities.

References

External links
 BEssARION 
Businesspeople from Tbilisi
Living people
Fashion designers from Georgia (country)
Russian fashion designers
Year of birth missing (living people)